The Fayette State Correctional Institution is a 2,000 bed maximum-security prison located in a remote section of Fayette County, Pennsylvania, in the United States. The prison is located southeast of Pittsburgh and was built to replace two institutions (SCI-Waynesburg and SCI-Pittsburgh) to make the Commonwealth's prison system more energy-efficient. It is the only prison in the Commonwealth where Pennsylvania license plates are manufactured, holding that distinction since 2003.

Construction of SCI-Fayette
The $125 million,  facility was constructed on a former strip mine site. The institution covers  under roof and  within the perimeter fence. The construction of the prison included a sewage treatment plant for the prison and neighboring communities in the township.

Notable inmates
Caleb Fairley - murderer
Adam Leroy Lane - murderer
Gilbert Newton III - murderer

See also
List of Pennsylvania state prisons

References

Prisons in Pennsylvania
Buildings and structures in Fayette County, Pennsylvania
2003 establishments in Pennsylvania